Leptotila is a genus of birds in the dove and pigeon family Columbidae. These are ground-foraging doves that live in the Americas.

The genus Leptotila was introduced by the English naturalist William John Swainson in 1837 with the Caribbean dove Leptotila jamaicensis as the type species. The genus name combines the Ancient Greek leptos meaning "delicate" or "slender" with  meaning "feather".

The genus contains the following 11 species:
 White-tipped dove, Leptotila verreauxi   
 Yungas dove, Leptotila megalura
 Grey-fronted dove, Leptotila rufaxilla
 Grey-headed dove, Leptotila plumbeiceps 
 Pallid dove, Leptotila pallida 
 Azuero dove, Leptotila battyi – split from the grey-headed dove
 Grenada dove, Leptotila wellsi 
 Caribbean dove, Leptotila jamaicensis 
 Grey-chested dove, Leptotila cassinii 
 Ochre-bellied dove, Leptotila ochraceiventris
 Tolima dove, Leptotila conoveri

Cladogram showing the position of Leptotila among its closest relatives:

References

 
Bird genera
Taxonomy articles created by Polbot